The Diocese of Osimo was a Roman Catholic diocese in Italy.

It was founded in the seventh century and in 1725 merged with the Diocese of Cingoli to form the Diocese of Osimo e Cingoli.

It was contained within the Papal States.

Ordinaries

Diocese of Osimo
Erected: 7th Century
Latin Name: Auximanus

Giambattista Sinibaldi (Joannes Baptista de Sinibaldis) (13 Jun 1515 – 9 Apr 1547 Died)
Cipriano Senili (Cyprianis Senili) (13 May 1547 – 19 Jul 1551 Died)
Bernardino de Cupis (bishop) (24 Aug 1551 – 1574 Resigned)
Cornelio Firmano (9 Jan 1574 – 5 Jul 1588 Died)
Teodosio Fiorenzi (Theodosius Florentinus) (27 Jul 1588 – 19 May 1591 Died)
Antonio Maria Gallo (19 Jul 1591 – 30 Mar 1620 Died)
Agostino Galamini, O.P. (29 Apr 1620 – 6 Sep 1639 Died)
Girolamo Verospi (10 Feb 1642 – 5 Jan 1652 Died)
Lodovico Betti (1 Jul 1652 – 1655 Died)
Antonio Bichi (6 Mar 1656 – 21 Feb 1691 Died)
Opizio Pallavicini (8 Aug 1691 – 11 Feb 1700 Died)
Michelangelo dei Conti (28 Jan 1709 – 1 Aug 1712 Appointed, Archbishop (Personal Title) of Viterbo e Tuscania)
Orazio Filippo Spada (17 Jan 1714 – 28 Jun 1724 Died)
Agostino Pipia, O.P. (20 Dec 1724 – Jan 1726 Resigned)

Diocese of Osimo e Cingoli
19 August 1725: United with the Diocese of Cingoli
Immediately Subject to the Holy See

Pier Secondo Radicati de Cocconato (12 Apr 1728 – 1 Dec 1729 Died)
Ferdinando Agostino Bernabei, O.P. (23 Dec 1729 – 10 Mar 1734 Died)
Giacomo Lanfredini (27 Mar 1734 – 15 Sep 1740 Resigned)
Pompeo Compagnoni (16 Sep 1740 – 25 Jul 1774 Died)
Guido Calcagnini (20 May 1776 – 27 Aug 1807 Died)
Giovanni Castiglione (11 Jan 1808 – 9 Jan 1815 Died)
Carlo Andrea Pelagallo (18 Dec 1815 – 6 Sep 1822 Died)
Ercole Dandini (10 Mar 1823 – 23 May 1824 Resigned)
Timoteo Maria (Antonio) Ascensi, O.C.D. (21 May 1827 – 6 Dec 1828 Died)
Giovanni Antonio Benvenuti (15 Dec 1828 – 14 Nov 1838 Died)
Giovanni Soglia Ceroni (18 Feb 1839 – 4 Jun 1848 Appointed, Secretary of State)
Giovanni Brunelli (18 Sep 1856 – 21 Feb 1861 Died)
Salvatore Nobili Vitelleschi (21 Dec 1863 – 20 Nov 1871 Resigned)
Michele Seri-Molini (24 Nov 1871 – 13 Apr 1888 Died)
Egidio Mauri, O.P. (1 Jun 1888 – 12 Jun 1893 Appointed, Archbishop of Ferrara)
Giovanni Battista Scotti (18 May 1894 – 5 Dec 1916 Died)
Pacifico Fiorani (12 May 1917 – 22 Jun 1924 Died)
Monalduzio Leopardi (20 Dec 1926 – 17 May 1944 Died)
Domenico Brizi (22 Jan 1945 – 11 Feb 1964 Died)
Carlo Maccari (28 Sep 1972 – 30 Sep 1986 Appointed, Archbishop of Ancona-Osimo)

Diocese of Osimo
25 January 1985: The former Diocese of Cingoli was split from the Diocese of Osimo e Cingoli and united with the Diocese of Macerata e Tolentino, the Diocese of Recanati, and the Diocese of San Severino (-Treia) to form the Diocese of Macerata-Tolentino-Recanati-Cingoli-Treia.

30 September 1986: the Diocese of Osimo was united with the Archdiocese of Ancona to form the Archdiocese of Ancona-Osimo

See also
Diocese of Cingoli

References

External links
 GCatholic.org

Former Roman Catholic dioceses in Italy
Dioceses established in the 7th century